Celtic toponymy is the study of place names wholly or partially of Celtic origin. These names are found throughout continental Europe, Britain, Ireland, Anatolia and, latterly, through various other parts of the globe not originally occupied by Celts.

Celtic languages

The Proto-Indo-European language developed into various daughter languages, including the Proto-Celtic language.

In Proto-Celtic ("PC"), the Proto-Indo-European ("PIE") sound *p disappeared, perhaps through an intermediate *. It is a common point between all the Celtic languages. Examples : Latin pater "father", but Gaulish *atir / ater (atrebo, dativ plural), (Old) Irish athair / athir.

After that, languages derived from Proto-Celtic changed PC *kw into either *p or *k (see: P-Celtic and Q-Celtic languages). In P-Celtic languages, PC *kw changed into *p. In Q-Celtic dialects it developed into /k/.

P-Celtic languages include the Continental Gaulish language and the Brittonic branch of Insular Celtic. Common Brittonic is the ancestor of Welsh, Cornish and Breton.

Ancient Q-Celtic languages include the Continental Celtiberian and the Goidelic branch of Insular Celtic. Goidelic is the ancestor of the Gaelic languages Irish, Scottish Gaelic and Manx.

Examples : PIE *kʷetwóres "four" >
 Proto-Italic kʷettwōr "four" > Latin quattuor
 Proto-Celtic kʷetwares "four" >  Irish ceathair, Scottish Gaelic ceithir "four", but Gaulish petuar[ios] "fourth", Welsh pedwar "four", Old Breton petguar > Breton pevar "four"

Frequent elements in place-names and their cognates in modern Celtic languages 

 Celtic , suffix : Gaulish -(i)acon (Latin -(i)acum / (i)acus) < endings -[a]y, -[e]y, -é, -(i)ac in Gaul. Brittonic *-ocon / -*ogon 'place of, property of'; Old Breton -oc > -euc > -ek / -eg (-ec), Welsh -(i)og, etc.
 Celtic  'base, foundation' > Old Irish  'base, stem,  stock', Welsh  'base, stem,  stock'
 Celtic  'hill, high place' > Welsh  'honourable, respected' (not directly related to Welsh  'hill'), Irish  'hill; strength, vigour, significance'. 
 Celtic  'high, lofty, elevated'; used as a feminine divine name, rendered Brigantia in Latin, Old Irish  'exalted one', name of a goddess.
 Celtic  'bridge'
 Celtic  'water' > Old Irish  'water', Welsh Welsh , Cornish dur, Breton dour 'water'
 Celtic  'fortress' > Welsh  'city' and  'fortress', Irish  'fortress'
 Celtic  'door, gate, forum' > Welsh , Breton dor 'door'
 Celtic  'clearing (wood), assart' > Welsh (tir) ial
 Celtic  'head' > Gallo-Brythonic *penn-, Welsh  'head, end, chief, supreme', Breton penn, but  Old Irish cenn > Irish  'head'
 Celtic  'field, plain' > Welsh  'field', Old Irish mag > Irish  'plain'
 Celtic  'wood', 'sacred enclosure', 'sanctuary' > Old Irish nemed 'sanctuary' 
 Celtic  'ford' > Welsh rhyd 'ford'
 Celtic  'white, fair, blessed' > Welsh  /  'white, blessed', Old Irish , Irish  'fair'

European connection

Brigantium
Cambodunum > Champéon (France, Cambdonno / Cambindonno 6-7th century), Champbezon (France, Chambedon 11th century), Kempten (Germany, Camboduno 3rd century)
Mediolanum > Meulan (France), Milano (Italy)..
Noviomagus > Nouvion, Nogent, Novion, Nijon, etc. (France), Nijmegen (Netherland); Chichester, Crayford (UK)
Ebur(i)acum > Ivry, Évry (France), former name of York (UK)
Epiacum > Epfig (Alsace, France, Epiaco 12th century); X (unknown location in Great-Britain)
Lugdunum > Lyon, Lion, Loudun, Laon, Lauzun (France), Leiden / Leyde (Netherlands)
Rigomagus > Riom (France), Remagen (Germany)
Segodunum  > Suin, Syon (France); X unclear location near Würzburg (Germany)
Vuerodunum > several Verdun (France), Verduno (Italy, Piedmont), Verdú (Spain, Catalonia), Birten (Germany, Xanten)

Continental Celtic

Austria
Bregenz, Vorarlberg, Latin Brigantium : from Celtic  'high, lofty, elevated' (or divine name, Brigantia)
Wien, English Vienna, Latin Vindobona : from Celtic  'white' (Welsh ) +  'base, foundation' (Welsh  'base, bottom, stump', Irish  'bottom, base')

Belgium
Ardennes, Latin Arduenna Silva : from divine name Arduinna : from Celtic  'high' (Irish ) + Latin  'forest'
Ghent : from divine name Gontia

Czech Republic 
Košťany, originally Costen, from Celtic (Cornish)  'tin mine'

France
Most of the main cities in France have a Celtic name (the original Gaulish one or the name of the Gaulish tribe).

Amiens : from Ambiani, a Celtic tribe, replaces Samarobriva 'bridge on the river Somme'
Angers : from Andecavi, a Celtic tribe, replaces Juliomagus 'market place dedicated to Julius'
Argentan : from Argentomagus 'silver market', based on arganto- 'silver' cognate to Old Welsh argant > ariant, Old Breton argant > Breton arc'hant 'silver' + magos 'market'
several places called Argenton
 Argentorate, now Strasbourg
Arles : from Arelate
Arras : from Atrebates, a Celtic tribe, replaces Nemetacum, nemeto- 'sacred place' + suffix -acon
Augustonemetum, now Clermont-Ferrand
Autun : from Augustodunum, 'town dedicated to Augustus'
Bayeux :  from Badiocassi / Bodiocassi, a Celtic tribe, replaces  Augustodurum. 'forum dedicated to Augustus'
Bourges : from Biturigi, a Celtic tribe, replaces Avaricum
Briançon < Brigantium, from Celtic  'high, lofty, elevated' (or divine name, Brigantia)
several places called Briançon
Brive < Briva 'bridge'
several places called Brives
Caen < Catumagos : from Old Celtic  'battle' 'fight' 'combat', Old Irish  'battle, battalion, troop', Breton  /, Welsh  'combat, troop';  'field, plain', Old Irish . The general meaning seems to be 'battlefield'
several places called Cahan, Cahon
Cahors
Carentan : from Carentomagus
several places called Charenton, etc.
Chambord
several places called Chambord, Chambors, Chambourg
 Chartres : from Carnuti, name of a Celtic tribe, replaces Autricum
Condom : from Condatomagus
other place : Condom-d'Aubrac
Divodurum (Latin), now Metz, Lorraine, from Celtic  'god, holy, divine' (Scottish Gaelic  'god') + * 'fort'
Douvres (also the French name of Dover) from Celtic dubron, dubra 'water'
several places called Douvres
Drevant : from Derventum, Celtic dervo 'oak tree' + suffix -entu
Évreux : from Eburovici replaces Mediolanum (see below)
Issoudun
Jort : from Divoritum 'ford on the river Dives' (Dives from Celtic *dewo 'stream')
Lillebonne : from Juliobona 'foundation dedicated to Julius'
Limoges
Lisieux < (Civitas) Lexoviensis; former Noviomagus 'new market', Old Celtic  'new',  'field, plain'.
Lyon, Rhône, Latin Lugdunum : from Celtic  'Lugus' (divine name) or perhaps 'light' + *dūnon 'fortress'
several places called Lugdunum : Laon, Lion-en-Beauce, Loudon, Saint-Bertrand-de-Comminges, etc.  
Mediolanum : from Celtic
several places called Meillant, Meulan, etc.
Nant
several places called Nant, Nans
Nantes
Nanteuil
several places called Nanteuil, Nantheuil, Nampteuil, Nanteau..
Nanterre (Nemptu doro 5th century) : from nemeto- 'sacred place' + duro- 'gate', 'forum' 
Noyon, Latin Noviomagus Veromanduorum, from Celtic  'new' (Welsh ) +  'field, plain'
several places called Noviomagus : Nouvion, Noyen, Nyons, Nijon, Nojeon, Lisieux, Saint-Paul-Trois-Châteaux, etc.
Oissel
several places called Oisseau, Ussel, etc.
Orange : from Arausio, a water god
Paris : from Parisii (Gaul), name of a Celtic tribe, replaces Lukotekia / Lutetia
Périgueux / Périgord : from Petrocorii 'the four armies'
Pierremande < Petromantalum < petro-mantalo- 'four road' = 'crossing'
Rennes : from Redones, a Celtic tribe, replaces Condate
several places called Condé, Condat, Candé, etc.
Riom : from Rigomagus
Rouen < Rotomagus, sometimes Ratómagos or Ratumacos (on the coins of the Veliocassi tribe). It can be roto-, the word for 'wheel' or 'race', cf. Old Irish roth 'wheel' 'race' or Welsh rhod 'wheel' 'race'. Magos is surer here : 'field', 'plain' or later 'market' cf. Old Irish  (gen. ) 'field' 'plain', Old Breton  'place'. The whole thing could mean 'hippodrome', 'racecourse' or 'wheel market'.
several places called Rouans, Ruan, Rom, etc. 
Vandœuvre < *vindo-briga 'white fortress'
several places called Vandœuvres, Vendeuvre, Vendœuvres
Verdun, Virodunum or Verodunum, from Celtic  'high' and  'hill, fortress'
several places called Verdun 
Verneuil : from verno- + ialo- 'clearing, plain with alder-trees'
several places called Verneuil
Vernon < Vernomagus. There are other Vernons in France, but they come directly from Vernō 'place of the alder-trees'. 'plain of the alder-trees'. uernā 'alder-tree', Old Irish , Breton, Welsh , dial. French  / .
several places called Vernon
Veuves : from vidua 'forest' Voves, Vion
several places called Voves, Vove
Vion : from Vidumagus 'forest market'
several places called Vion, Vions

Germany

Alzenau 
From Celtic , s.f., 'alder'. (Compare the modern German Erlenbach) and Old High German (OHG) aha, s.n., 'flowing water'.

de Amarahe (?), a lost river name near Fulda c. 800 CE
Amerbach, a stream near Groß-Umstadt, Babenhausen, Ober-Ramstadt
Ammer
Ammerbach
Ammergraben, a stream near Harpertshausen
Amorbach, a stream near Mümling and the village named after it.
Amorsbrunn
Wald-Amorbach < Perhaps from Celtic , 'channel, river'. Compare Indo-European *, 'channel, river' > Greek ἀμάρη (amárē), 'channel'. Or, from Celtic , 'spelt, a type of grain'.
Annelsbach a suburb of Höchst
Ansbach in Mittelfranken originally Onoltesbah 837 CE : from Celtic -, 'ash tree' plus an OHG bach, 'small river'.
Boiodurum, now Innstadt, Passau, Niederbayern : first element is Celtic , tribal name (Boii), possibly 'cattle-owner' (cf. Irish  'cow') or 'warrior'. Second element is Celtic  'fort'.
Bonn : from Celtic  'base, foundation' (Welsh  'base, bottom, stump')
Boppard : from Gaulish , "hill of victory". Containing the elements  'victory' (Welsh  'gain, benefit') + , 'hill'.
Düren, Nordrhein-Westfalen, Latin  : from Celtic  'fort'
Hercynia Silva (Latin), a vast forest including the modern Black Forest : from Celtic  'oak' or divine name Perkwunos + Latin  'forest'
Kempten im Allgäu, Bavaria, Latin Cambodūnum : Celtic cambodūnom, *cambo- 'curved, bent, bowed, crooked', dūnon 'fortress'
Mainz, Rheinland-Pfalz, Latin Moguntiacum : from Celtic , 'mighty, great, powerful', used as a divine name (see Mogons) + Celtic suffix -(i)acon
Meggingen : from Celtic  'plain, field'
Neumagen-Dhron, Rheinland-Pfalz, Latin Noviomagus Trevirorum 
Noviomagus Nemetum (Latin), now Speyer, Rheinland-Pfalz : from Celtic  'new' (Welsh ) +  'field, plain'
Remagen, Rheinland-Pfalz, Latin Rigomagus or Ricomagus : second element is from Celtic  'field, plain'. The first may be a variant of Celtic  'king, chief of *touta'
Tübingen : maybe hybrid form comprising a Celtic element and a Germanic suffix -ingen. The element tub- in Tübingen could possibly arise from a Celtic dubo-, s.m., 'dark, black; sad; wild'. As found in the Anglo-Irish placenames of Dublin, Devlin, Dowling, Doolin and Ballindoolin. Perhaps the reference is to the darkness of the river waters that flow near the town cf. river Doubs (France) and Dove (GB); if so, then the name can be compared to Tubney, Tubbanford, Tub Hole in England. Compare the late Vulgar Latin  'morass', from Gaulish.
Worms, Rheinland-Pfalz, Latin Borbetomagus : second element from Celtic , 'plain, field', first perhaps related to Old Irish  'fierce, violent, rough, arrogant; foolish'

Hungary
Hercynium jugum (Latin) : from Celtic  'oak' or divine name Perkwunos + Latin  'summit'

Italy

Brianza, Lombardy, Latin Brigantia : from Celtic  'high, lofty, elevated' (or divine name, Brigantia)
Genova, Liguria, English Genoa, Latin  : Perhaps from Celtic  'mouth [of a river]'. (However, this Ligurian place-name, as well as that of Genava (modern Geneva), probably derive the Proto-Indo-European root * 'knee'.)
Milano, Lombardy, English Milan, Latin Mediolanum : from Celtic medio- 'middle, central' > Old Irish mide 'middle, centre', Old Breton med, met > Breton mez 'middle', etc. and  > , a Celtic cognate of Latin  'plain', with typical Celtic loss of /p/ or  > Old Irish lán, Welsh llawn, Breton leun 'full'
Belluno, Veneto, Latin  : from Celtic * 'bright' and *dūnon 'fortress'.
Bergamo, Lombardy, Latin  : from Celtic  'high, lofty, elevated' (or divine name, Brigantia)
Brescia, Lombardy, Latin  : from Celtic *briga- 'rocky height or outcrop'.
Bologna, Emilia Romagna, Latin  : from Celtic * 'base, foundation' (Welsh  'base, bottom, stump')

Netherlands
Lugdunum Batavorum (Latin), now Katwijk, Zuid-Holland : from Celtic  'Lugus' (divine name) or perhaps 'light' + *dūnon 'fortress'
Nijmegen, Gelderland, Latin Ulpia Noviomagus Batavorum : from Celtic  'new' (Welsh ) +  'field, plain'

Poland
Lugidunum (Latin), now Legnica, Silesia : second element from Celtic  'fortress'

Portugal

Braga, Braga Municipality, Portugal : from Celtic  after the Bracari Celts.
Bragança, Alto Trás-os-Montes, Portugal : from Celtic  'divine name, Brigantia'.
Beira : from Celtic  Cailleach/ Cale's other name Cailleach-Bheura or Beira, the Celtic Goddess of mountains, water and Winter. Three Portuguese provinces: Beira-Baixa, Beira-Alta and Beira-Litoral
Vale de Cambra, Portugal : from Celtic  'chamber, room'. 
Conímbriga, Coimbra, Portugal : from Celtic  'rocky height or outcrop'. 
Évora, Alentejo, Portugal : from Celtic  'plural genitive of the word eburos (trees)'.
Lacobriga, Algarve, Portugal : from Celtic  'Lake of Briga'.

Romania
Băișoara and other sites in Transylvania
Boian in Sibiu, Boianu Mare in Bihor County, villages coming from Boii
Călan city in Hunedoara.
Deva, capital of Hunedoara, originally a city of the Dacians
Galați
Noviodunum now Isaccea means "new fortress"  + .
Timiș River in Banat.

Serbia
Singidunum (Latin), now Beograd, English Belgrade : second element from Celtic  'fortress'

Slovenia
Neviodunum (Latin), now Drnovo : second element from Celtic  'fortress'

Spain

Asturias and Cantabria 
Deva, several rivers in northern Spain, and Pontedeva, Galicia, Spain : from Celtic  'goddess; holy, divine'
Mons Vindius (now the Cantabrian Mountains), NW Spain : from Celtic  'white'.

Castile 

Galicia 

Tambre, a river in Galicia (Spain), Latin Tamaris : possibly from Celtic  'dark' (cf. Celtic  > Welsh  'darkness'). Other theories.
O Grove, Medieval Latin Ogrobre 912: from Celtic  'acute; promontory' and Celtic *brigs 'hill'.
Bergantiños, Medieval Latin Bregantinos 830 : from Celtic  'high, lofty, elevated', or divine name Brigantia, or from Celtic *brigantīnos 'chief, king'.
Dumbría, Medieval Latin Donobria 830 : from Celtic  'fortress' + Celtic * 'bridge'.
Val do Dubra and Dubra River, Galicia : from Celtic  'water',  'waters' (Welsh ).
Monforte de Lemos (region), Latin Lemavos, after the local tribe of the Lemavi : from Celtic  'elm' + suffix -avo.
Nendos (region), Medieval Latin Nemitos 830 : from Celtic  'sanctuary'.
Noia, Galicia, Spain, Greek Nouion: from Celtic  'new' (Welsh ).

Switzerland
Switzerland, especially the Swiss Plateau, has many Celtic (Gaulish) toponyms. This old layer of names was overlaid with Latin names in the Gallo-Roman period, and, from the medieval period, with Alemannic German and Romance names.

For some names, there is uncertainty as to whether they are Gaulish or Latin in origin. 
In some rare cases, such as Frick, Switzerland, there have even been competing suggestions of Gaulish, Latin and Alemannic etymologies.

Examples of toponyms with established Gaulish etymology:
Solothurn, from Salodurum. The  element means "doors, gates; palisade; town". The etymology of the  element is unclear.
Thun, Bern:  "fort"
Windisch, Aargau, Latin Vindonissa: first element from  "white"
Winterthur, Zürich, Latin Vitudurum or Vitodurum, from  "willow" and 
Yverdon-les-Bains, from Eburodunum, from  "yew" and  "fort".
Zürich, Latin Turicum, from a Gaulish personal name Tūros
Limmat, from Lindomagos "lake-plain", originally the name of the plain formed by the Linth and Lake Zurich.

Insular Celtic

Goidelic

England
Place names in England derived partly or wholly from Goidelic languages include:
Cambois, Northumberland, possibly from Old Irish  ("bay, creek")
 Carperby, Yorkshire containing the Irish Gaelic given-name Cairpe
Dovenby, from personal name Dufan of Irish origin (OIr 'Dubhán')
Dunmallard, Cumberland, possibly from Middle Irish *dùn-mallacht ("fort of curses") 
Fixby, from the Gaelic Irish personal name Fiach
Glassonby, from the Irish personal name Glassan
Liscard, Cheshire, possibly from Irish Gaelic  meaning "fort of the rock".
Malmesbury, from the Irish founder of the abbey Máel Dub
Melmerby, Yorkshire, from the Old Irish personal name Máel Muire

Place names that directly reference the Irish include Irby, Irby upon Humber, Ireby and Ireleth.

Ireland

The vast majority of placenames in Ireland are anglicized Irish language names.

Scotland

The majority of placenames in the Highlands of Scotland (part of the United Kingdom) are either Scottish Gaelic or anglicized Scottish Gaelic. Gaelic-derived placenames are very common in the rest of mainland Scotland also. Pictish-derived placenames can be found in the northeast, while Brythonic-derived placenames can be found in the south.

Isle of Man

The majority of placenames on the Isle of Man (a Crown dependency) are Manx or anglicized Manx.

Brythonic

England (excluding Cornwall)
Evidence for a Celtic root to place names in England is widely strengthened by early monastic charters, chronicles and returns: examples relate to Leatherhead and Lichfield. To describe a place as of the Celts, the Old English wealh becoming Wal/Wall/Welsh is often used. This was the main Germanic term for Romano-Celtic peoples, such as the Britons. Such names are a minority, but are widespread across England. For example, a smattering of villages around the heart and east of The Fens hint at this: West Walton, Walsoken, and the Walpoles indicate their continued presence. Nearby Wisbech, King's Lynn and Chatteris have Celtic topographical elements.

Arden (forest of), Warwickshire
From Celtic  'high' (Irish )
Avon (river), Gloucestershire/Wiltshire/Somerset
Avon (river), Wiltshire/Hampshire/Dorset
Avon (river), Northamptonshire/Warwickshire/Worcestershire/Gloucestershire
Avon or Aune (river), Devon
From Brythonic  'river' (Welsh )
Axe (river), Devon/Dorset
Axe (river), Somerset
Axminster, Devon
Axmouth, Devon
From Celtic  'water' (Irish uisce)
Brean, Somerset
Bredon, Worcestershire
Breedon on the Hill, Leicestershire
Brewood, Staffordshire
Brill, Buckinghamshire
First element from Celtic  'hill'
Brent (river), Greater London
Brentford, Greater London
From Celtic  'high, lofty, elevated' (or divine name, Brigantia)
Bryn, Greater Manchester
Derived from Welsh bryn, 'hill'.
Camulodunum (Latin), now Colchester, Essex
From  'Camulus' (divine name) + Celtic *dūnon 'fortress'
Creech St Michael, Somerset
Crewkerne, Somerset
Crich, Derbyshire
Cricket St Thomas, Somerset
Crickheath, Shropshire
Cricklade, Wiltshire
First element from Brythonic *crüg 'hill' (Irish cruach)
Crewe, Cheshire
From Old Welsh *criu 'river crossing'
Dever (river), Hampshire
Deverill (river), Wiltshire
Devon, Latin Dumnonia
First two possibly linked.  Latter from tribal name Dumnonii or Dumnones, from Celtic  'deep', 'world'
Dover, Kent, Latin Dubris
Andover, Hampshire
Wendover, Buckinghamshire
From Celtic  'water',  'waters' (Welsh ; Breton )
Durham, County Durham, Latin Dunelm
First element is possibly dun, ' hill fort' (Welsh , 'fort').
Durobrivae (Latin), now Rochester, Kent and Water Newton, Cambridgeshire
Durovernum Cantiacorum (Latin), now Canterbury, Kent
First element from Celtic  'fort'; in Dūrobrīvae, Celtic  'bridge'
Eskeleth, North Yorkshire
Possibly derived from Brythonic *iska, 'water, fish' and *leith, 'damp, wet'.
Exe (river), Devon/Somerset
Nether Exe, Devon
Up Exe, Devon
Exebridge, Devon
Exford, Somerset
Exeter, Devon, Latin Isca Dumnoniorum
Exminster, Devon
Exmouth, Devon
Exton, Somerset
Exwick, Devon
From Celtic  'water' (Irish ); second element in Isca Dumnoniorum (Exeter) is a tribal name (see Devon)
Frome 
from the Brythonic word Frama meaning fair, fine or brisk.
Leatherhead, Surrey
From Brythonic *lēd- [from Celtic ] +  [from Celtic ] = "Grey Ford"
Lincoln, Lincolnshire, Latin Lindum Colonia
From Celtic  'pool' + Latin  'colony'
Manchester, Latin Mamucium or Mancunium
From Celtic  'breast' (referring to the shape of a hill)
Noviomagus (Latin), now Chichester, West Sussex and Crayford, Kent
From Celtic  'new' (Welsh ) +  'field, plain'
Pen y Ghent, Yorkshire
Pengethley, Herefordshire
From Brythonic *penn- 'hill, top, head, chief' (Welsh ) + possibly *kelli 'to stand' (Welsh gelli)
Pencoyd, Herefordshire
Penge, Greater London
Penketh, Cheshire
From Brythonic  'hill, top, head, chief' (Welsh ) +  'wood' (Welsh coed), or  'wood'
Pencraig, Herefordshire
Pendlebury, Greater Manchester
Pendleton, Lancashire
Pendock, Worcestershire
First element from Brythonic *penn- 'hill, top, head, chief' (Welsh  'head, end, chief, supreme') = Irish  'head', from Proto-Celtic 
Penn, Buckinghamshire
Penn, West Midlands
From Brythonic *penn- 'hill' (Welsh )
Lower Penn, Staffordshire
From English lower + Brythonic *penn- 'hill'
 Penshaw, Sunderland
From Brythonic *penn- 'hill' and possibly p-Celtic  'rocks'. This matches the earliest attestation from c. 1190, Pencher.

Old Sarum, Wiltshire, Latin Sorviodūnum
Second element from Celtic  'fortress'
Segedunum (Latin), now Wallsend, Tyne and Wear
First element conjectured to be Celtic for 'victorious', 'strength' or 'dry' (theories). Second element is Celtic  'fortress'.
Sinodun Hills, south Oxfordshire
From Celtic  'old' +  'fortress'
Tamar (river), Devon/Cornwall
Tame (river), Greater Manchester
Tame (river), North Yorkshire
Tame (river), West Midlands
Team (river), Tyne and Wear
Teme (river), Welsh Tefeidiad, Wales/Shropshire/Worcestershire
Thames (river), Latin Tamesis
Possibly from Celtic  'dark' (cf. Celtic  > Welsh  'darkness'). Other theories.
Trinovantum (Latin), now London
'Of the Trinovantes', a tribal name, perhaps 'very energetic people' from Celtic  (intensive) +  'energetic', related to  'new' (Welsh )
Verulamium (Latin), now St Albans, Hertfordshire
From Brittonic *weru- 'broad' + *lam- 'hand' [from Celtic ] (Welsh , Irish )
Vindobala (Latin), Roman fort in Northumberland
Vindolanda (Latin), Roman fort in Northumberland
Vindomora (Latin), Roman fort in County Durham.
First element from Celtic  'white' (Welsh ); in Vindolanda, Celtic  'land, place' (Welsh ). In Vindomora, second element could be 'sea' (Welsh , Irish ).
Wigan, Greater Manchester

Scotland
The post-6th century AD Brittonic languages of Northern England and Scotland were Cumbric and Pictish. Cumbric place-names are found in Scotland south of the River Forth, while Pictish names are found to the north.
Aberdeen, Aberdeenshire
From * ("river mouth").
Applecross, Ross-shire
Formerly Abercrosan, from aber ("river mouth").
Arran
Possibly equivalent to Middle Welsh aran ("high place").
Aviemore, Inverness-shire
An Aghaidh Mhòr in Gaelic, possibly involving Brittonic *ag- ("a cleft").
Ben Lomond, Stirlingshire
Lomond is equivalent to Welsh  ("beacon").
Blantyre, Lanarkshire
Equivalent to Welsh  ("extremes, source, front") +  ("land").
Blebo, Fife
Formerly Bladebolg, from Brittonic *blawd ("meal") + *bolg ("sack").
Burnturk, Fife
Formerly Brenturk, equivalent to Welsh  ("boar hill").
Dallas, Moray
Equivalent to Welsh  ("haugh, meadow") +  ("abode").
Darnaway, Moray
Ultimately from ancient Brittonic Taranumagos ("tunder-plain").
Daviot, Inverness-shire
Perhaps from Brittonic *dem- meaning "sure, strong".
Dull, Perthshire
Equivalent to Welsh  ("haugh, meadow").
Ecclefechan, Dumfriesshire
Possibly equivalent to Welsh  ("small church").
Edinburgh, Midlothian
From Din Ediyn, from a Brittonic form meaning "fort of Ediyn" (c.f. Welsh ).
Esslemont, Aberdeenshire
Equivalent to Welsh  ("low hill").
Glasgo, Aberdeenshire
See Glasgow, Lanarkshire below.
Glasgow, Lanarkshire
Equivalent to Welsh  ("blue hollow").
Hebrides
Ebudes in Ptolemy (c. 140 AD), possibly from ancient Brittonic ep- ("a horse"; c.f. Welsh ).
Keith, Banffshire
Equivalent to Welsh  ("wood, forest").
Lanark, Lanarkshire
Equivalent to Welsh  ("a glade").
Landrick, Perthshire
See Lanark, Lanarkshire.
Lanrick, Perthshire
See Lanark, Lanarkshire.
Lauder, Berwickshire
Equivalent either to Middle Breton  or Welsh .
Lendrick, Kinross-shire.
See Lanark, Lanarkshire.
Lendrick, Perthshire
See Lanark, Lanarkshire.
Lomond Hills, Fife
See Ben Lomond, Stirlingshire.
Mayish, Arran
Possibly from Brittonic maɣes ("field"; Welsh ).
Meggernie, Perthshire
From an element cognate with Welsh  ("boggy meadow").
Methven, Perthshire
Equivalent to Welsh  ("meadstone").
Midmar, Aberdeenshire
Equivalent to Welsh  ("bog, swamp") + Marr (a district name).
Migvie, Aberdeenshire
Equivalent to Welsh  ("bog, swamp").
Mounth, Perthshire, Angus and Aberdeenshire
Equivalent to Welsh  ("mountain, moor, hill").
Ochil Hills, Fife
Probably from Common Brittonic *okelon ("a ridge").
Orchy, Argyll (river)
In Gaelic Urchaidh, from ancient Brittonic are-cētia ("on the wood").
Panbride, Angus
From pant ("a hollow").
Panlathy, Angus
From pant ("a hollow").
Panmure, Angus
Equivalent to Welsh  ("big hollow").
Pendewen, Angus
First element is possibly equivalent to Welsh  ("head, top, summit, source").
Penicuik, Midlothian
Equivalent to Welsh  ("summit of the cuckoo").
Pennan, Aberdeenshire
Probably equivalent to Welsh  ("head, top, summit, source").
Pennygant Hill, Roxburghshire
See Pen y Ghent, Yorkshire, England.
Perth, Perthshire
Probably equivalent to Welsh  ("bush").
Pinderachy, Anugs
First element is possibly equivalent to Welsh  ("head, top, summit, source").
Pinnel, Fife
Possibly equivalent to Welsh  ("head, top, summit, source").
Pulrossie, Sutherland 
Possibly equivalent to Welsh  ("promontory pool").
Rattray, Aberdeenshire
Equivalent to Welsh  ("ramparts town").
Urquhart, Ross-shire
Formerly Airdchartdan, equivalent to Middle Welsh  ("on the enclosure").
Yell, Shetland
Probably from Common Brittonic iâla ("unfruitful land, pasture").

Wales

The vast majority of placenames in Wales (part of the United Kingdom) are either Welsh or anglicized Welsh.

Cornwall
The vast majority of placenames in Cornwall are either Cornish or anglicized Cornish. For examples, see List of places in Cornwall.

Brittany
The vast majority of placenames in the west of Brittany (part of France) are either Breton or derived from Breton. For examples, see :Category:Populated places in Brittany.

See also 
Aber and Inver as place-name elements
Celtic onomastics
List of Celtic place names in Portugal

Notes

Toponymy
Place name etymologies